AKV may refer to:

 AKV, the IATA abbreviation for Akulivik Airport
 AKV (virus), a murine leukemia virus